I Used to Be Fat is an MTV reality series about overweight teens striving to achieve weight loss through means of diet and exercise. Each episode follows one teenager who is paired with a motivational personal trainer. The trainer teaches them new exercise and eating habits over a few months while offering emotional support. Documented students share their personal trials and tribulations in the series.

Several episodes of the show have covered a high school student's last summer before college. These students expressed a desire for a metamorphosis before they start their new lives away from home.

Episodes

Series overview

Season 1 (2010–11)

Season 2 (2013)

References

External links 

 

2010s American reality television series
2010 American television series debuts
2013 American television series endings
English-language television shows
MTV original programming
Fitness reality television series